The 2001 New Jersey State Senate elections were held on November 6.

The election took place alongside Jim McGreevey's landslide election as Governor of New Jersey and were held in the immediate aftermath of the September 11, 2001 terrorist attacks, which killed 750 New Jerseyans and impacted many others. Under a newly redrawn map, Democrats gained five seats to split control of the Senate evenly. A power-sharing agreement was reached with John O. Bennett and Richard Codey as co-Presidents of the Senate.

Background

Redistricting 

As required, the New Jersey legislature redistricted its state legislative districts in advance of the 2001 election. Most Senators remained in their existing districts, though Senator Kevin J. O'Toole was redistricted to the 40th district and chose not to challenge.

The new map was based on a revised Democratic map chosen by Professor Larry Bartels of Princeton University, the non-partisan member of the reapportionment commission.

Republicans challenged the district map under the Voting Rights Act of 1965, arguing that by shifting some African-American and Hispanic voters out of three predominantly minority districts in and around Newark and spreading them to other, mostly white districts, the plan diluted minority voting strength. The case was rejected by the U.S. Court for the District of New Jersey. The Republican suit was dismissed partly under the influence of the near-unanimous support of New Jersey's incumbent minority legislators for the Democratic claim that their map would result in more minority representation, rather than less.

Incumbents not running for re-election

Democratic 
 John A. Lynch Jr. (District 17)

Republican 
 Jack Sinagra (District 18) (resigned October 23)
 Kevin O'Toole (District 21) (redistricted into District 40; ran for Assembly)
 Donald DiFrancesco (District 22) (ran for Governor)
 William E. Schluter (District 23) (redistricted into District 15; ran for Governor as an Independent)

Summary of results by State Senate district

District 1

District 2

District 3

District 4

District 5

District 6

District 7

District 8

District 9

District 10

District 11

District 12

District 13

District 14

District 15

District 16

District 17

District 18

District 19

District 20

District 21

District 22

District 23

District 24

District 25

District 26

District 27

District 28

District 29

District 30

District 31

District 32

District 33

District 34

District 35

District 36

District 37

District 38

District 39

District 40

References 

New Jersey State Senate elections
New Jersey State Senate
2001 New Jersey elections